Cephalobidae is a family of nematodes belonging to the order Rhabditida.

Genera

Genera:
 Acrobeles von Linstow, 1877
 Acrobeloides Cobb, 1924
 Scottnema Timm, 1971

References

Nematodes